Green Hill may refer to:

 Green Hill (Lancashire), a 626 m mountain in Lancashire, England

Cities, towns, and villages
 Green Hill, Alabama, Alabama, United States
 Green Hill, Indiana, Indiana, United States
 Green Hill, Rhode Island, United States, a village in South Kingstown
 Green Hill, Tennessee, Tennessee, United States
 Green Hill, Wiltshire, England
 a rural area near Malmsbury, Australia
 Zielona Góra (Green Hill in Polish), a town in Lubusz Voivodeship, Poland

Other
 Green Hill House, listed on the National Register of Historic Places 
 Green Hill (Hillsborough, North Carolina), plantation in Hillsborough, North Carolina
 Green Hill (Virginia Beach, Virginia), listed on the National Register of Historic Places 
 Green Hill Zone, a level in the Sonic the Hedgehog video game
 Green Hill Country, a fictional location in J. R. R. Tolkien's Middle-earth
 Green Hill Site, listed on the NRHP in Massachusetts
 Green Hill Cemetery (disambiguation)

See also
 Greenhill (disambiguation)
 Greenhills (disambiguation)
 Green Hills (disambiguation)